8/6 may refer to:
August 6 (month-day date notation)
June 8 (day-month date notation)